Eudipleurina is a genus of moths of the family Crambidae.

Species
Eudipleurina ambrensis Leraut, 1989
Eudipleurina ankaratrella (Marion, 1957)
Eudipleurina viettei Leraut, 1989

References

Scopariinae
Crambidae genera